Šarbanovac  is a village in the municipality of Bor, Serbia. According to the 2011 census, it has a population of 1624 people.

References

Populated places in Bor District
Bor, Serbia